Mount Zagora (Jbel Zagora), also known as Tazagourt is a mountain in south-eastern Morocco, in the region of Drâa-Tafilalet.

Geography
The mountain is situated in the Little Atlas range and gives its name to the nearby town of Zagora. It has a double peak with one of the summits reaching 1030 m and the other 971 m. 

On the top of the Zagora mountain the remains of an Almoravid fortress can still be seen.

References

External links
 Lexicorient

Zagora
Geography of Drâa-Tafilalet